In model theory, a subfield of mathematical logic, an atomic model is a model such that the complete type of every tuple is axiomatized by a single formula. Such types are called principal types, and the formulas that axiomatize them are called complete formulas.

Definitions

Let T be a theory. A complete type p(x1, ..., xn) is called principal or atomic (relative to T) if it is axiomatized relative to T by a single formula φ(x1, ..., xn) ∈ p(x1, ..., xn).

A formula φ is called complete in T if for every formula ψ(x1, ..., xn), the theory T ∪ {φ} entails exactly one of ψ and ¬ψ.
It follows that a complete type is principal if and only if it contains a complete formula.

A model M is called atomic if every n-tuple of elements of M satisfies a formula that is complete in Th(M)—the theory of M.

Examples

The ordered field of real algebraic numbers is the unique atomic model of the theory of real closed fields. 
Any finite model is atomic.
A dense linear ordering without endpoints is atomic.
Any prime model of a countable theory is atomic by the omitting types theorem. 
Any countable atomic model is prime, but there are plenty of atomic models that are not prime, such as an uncountable dense linear order without endpoints.
The theory of a countable number of independent unary relations is complete but has no completable formulas and no atomic models.

Properties

The back-and-forth method can be used to show that any two countable atomic models of a theory that are elementarily equivalent are isomorphic.

Notes

References
 
 

Model theory